Monterey is a ghost town in Angelina County, in the U.S. state of Texas. It is located within the Lufkin, Texas micropolitan area.

History
Monterey was the site of a mill established by the Industrial Lumber Company. The community had a general store operated by F.W. Speed. A post office was established at Monterey in 1902 and remained in operation until 1913 when it received its mail from nearby Huntington. The postmaster was Alfred J. Wigley. The St. Louis Southwestern Railway of Texas extended its railway past Monterey in 1905. It had a population of 25 in 1910 and only became a railroad switch by World War II.

Geography

Education
Today, the ghost town is located within the Lufkin Independent School District.

See also
List of ghost towns in Texas

References

Geography of Angelina County, Texas
Ghost towns in East Texas